The Most Wanted is a most wanted list maintained by India's National Investigation Agency (NIA). Individuals usually are removed from the list only when they are captured or die or the charges against them are dropped.

History
In May 2011, following the killing of Osama bin Laden, India released a list of the 50 most wanted fugitives it alleged were hiding in Pakistan. The list was prepared in consultation with the Central Bureau of Investigation (CBI), the NIA, the Intelligence Bureau (IB) and various law enforcement agencies. According to Home Ministry spokesperson Onkar Kedia, the CBI had named 40 people and the NIA included 10 suspected terrorists in the list. However, it was later discovered that two of the people on the list submitted by the CBI were actually in India (one in jail, and the other was out on bail), following which the Home Ministry directed the agencies to review the list. India prepared a new list containing 48 names, and handed it over to Pakistan in July 2011. The list contained Interpol red corner notices, details of the crimes committed, aliases, Pakistani passport and identity document numbers of those allegedly hiding in Pakistan. 

Similar lists had been given to Pakistan in 2004, 2007, 2010 and March 2011. However, then Home Minister P. Chidambaram stated in a May 2011 interview with Karan Thapar on CNN-IBN that 'they never acted on any list,' were 'always dismissive' and described the process as a "ritual". He also blamed the CBI for errors in the 2011 list.

On 26 May 2013, DNA reported that NIA had asked every state to send a report every three months on the latest activities and intelligence about the fugitives on its list. A senior police officer told the newspaper that they had to provide "the latest information on the latest locations of these fugitives, whether they are dead or alive and if they attended any religious functions recently". The move was reportedly taken to prevent mistakes in the list, like the ones that had been found in the 2011 list.

In October 2018, the NIA released a new Most Wanted list containing 258 names (15 women), with the maximum reward going to the Maoist leader Mupalla L. Rao (aka Ganapathy).

See also
 FBI Most Wanted Terrorists

References

External links
 NIA official site Most Wanted list

Organized crime-related lists
Counterterrorism in India

Indian intelligence agencies
Most wanted lists